Courtney Bryan is a composer and pianist.

Early life and education 
Bryan was born in New Orleans, Louisiana. She obtained her Bachelor of Music from Oberlin College (2004), her Master of Music from Rutgers University (2007), and a Doctor of Musical Arts from Columbia University (2014), where her advisor was composer and trombonist George Lewis.

Career 
Bryan's work combines influences from jazz and gospel traditions.

Bryan is an assistant professor in the Newcomb College department of music at Tulane University. Additionally, she serves as composer-in-residence for the Jacksonville Symphony.

Awards 
In 2018, Bryan was a recipient of the Alpert Awards in the Arts.

In 2019 she received the Samuel Barber Rome Prize in musical composition.

References 

Living people
21st-century American composers
Musicians from New Orleans
21st-century American pianists
21st-century American women pianists
Year of birth missing (living people)
Classical musicians from Louisiana
Oberlin College alumni
Rutgers University alumni
Columbia University School of the Arts alumni
Tulane University faculty
American women classical composers
American classical composers
21st-century classical composers
21st-century women composers
American women academics